A piano sextet is a composition for piano and five other musical instruments, or a group of six musicians who perform such works. There is no standard grouping of instruments with that name, and compared to the string quartet or piano quintet literature, relatively few such compositions exist. The best-known piano sextet is probably the Sextet by Poulenc, one of the pinnacles of the wind and piano repertoire.  Chausson's Concert is widely regarded as one of the masterpieces of French strings and piano chamber music literature (for example, the critic Jean Gallois describes it as "superb").

The following is an incomplete list of piano sextet composers and their works in this genre:

 Theodor Blumer (1881-1964), Sextet, Op. 45, composed 1921, for piano and wind quintet
 Philippe Boesmans (1936–2022), Sextuor à clavier, composed 2005, for piano and string quintet
 Ernest Chausson (1855–1899), Concert in D major, Op. 21, composed 1891, for piano, violin, and string quartet
 Aaron Copland (1900–1990), Sextet, composed 1938, for piano, clarinet, and string quartet
 Ernst von Dohnányi (1877–1960), Sextet for string trio, clarinet, horn, and piano
 Louise Farrenc (1804–1875), Sextet in C minor, op. 40, composed 1852, for piano and wind quintet
 Mikhail Glinka (1804–1857)
Grand Sextet (Sestetto originale) in E-flat major, composed 1832, for piano, string quartet, and double bass
Serenade (Divertimento brillante) on Themes from Bellini's La Sonnambula in A-flat major, composed 1832, for piano, string quartet, and double bass
 Hans Huber (1852-1921) Sextet in B-flat major, composed 1898, for piano and wind quintet
 Vincent d'Indy (1851-1931), Sarabande et Menuet, Op. 72 for piano and wind quintet, arranged 1918 by the composer from his earlier Suite dans le style ancien, Op. 24 (1886) for 2 flutes, trumpet and string quartet
 Gordon Jacob (1895–1984), Sextet in B-flat major, composed 1956, for piano and wind quintet
 Joseph Jongen (1873–1953), Rapsodie, Op. 70, composed 1922, for piano and wind quintet
 Paul Juon (1872-1940), Divertimento, Op. 51, composed 1913, for piano and wind quintet
 Sergei Lyapunov (1859–1924), Sextet in B-flat minor, Op. 63, composed 1916/1921, for piano, string quartet, and double bass
 Bohuslav Martinů (1890–1959)
 ballet, La revue de cuisine, composed 1927,  for piano, violin, cello, clarinet, bassoon, and trumpet
Piano Sextet, composed 1929, for piano, flute, oboe, clarinet, and two bassoons
 Felix Mendelssohn (1809–1847), Sextet in D major, Op. 110, composed 1824, for piano, violin, two violas, cello, and double bass
 Krzysztof Penderecki (born 1933), Sextet for string trio, clarinet, horn, and piano
 Francis Poulenc (1899–1963), Sextet, composed 1939, for piano and wind quintet
 Sergei Prokofiev (1891–1953), Overture on Hebrew Themes in C minor, Op. 34, for piano, clarinet, and string quartet
 Albert Roussel (1869-1937), Divertissement, Op. 6, composed 1906, for piano and wind quintet
 Ludwig Thuille (1861–1907), Sextet in B-flat, Op. 6, composed 1886, for piano and wind quintet
 Felix Weingartner (1863–1942), Sextet Op.33; for piano, two violins, viola, violoncello and double bass
 Jorge Grundman (b. 1961), Piano Sextet in E minor Op. 83 for piano, two violins, viola, violoncello and double bass

Closely related forms of chamber music include the piano trio, the piano quartet and the piano quintet.

References

Piano
 
Types of musical groups